Prigorodnoye is a village in Chüy Region of Kyrgyzstan. It is part of the Alamüdün District. Its population was 7,406 in 2021.

Population

References

Populated places in Chüy Region